MPS, M.P.S., MPs, or mps may refer to:

Science and technology
 Mucopolysaccharidosis, genetic lysosomal storage disorder
 Mononuclear phagocyte system, cells in mammalian biology
 Myofascial pain syndrome
 Metallopanstimulin
 Potassium peroxymonosulfate, oxidizer commonly used for pools and spas
 Metre per second (m/s)
 Matrix product state, method to describe quantum many-body states
 Marginal propensity to save
 Mean-preserving spread, in probability and statistics
 Mail Preference Service, the Robinson list direct mail opt-out system
 Master Production Schedule, plan for individual commodities to be produced
 Method Performance Specifications, for analytical validation/verification of laboratory tests and systems required by the College of American Pathologists

Computing
 Mobile Programming System, by William Waite in the 1960s
 JetBrains MPS, Meta Programming System
 MPS (format), the Mathematical Programming System, a computer file format used to describe mathematical programming problems
 MultiProcessor Specification, Intel specification for multi-processor computers of x86 architecture
 Moving Particle Semi-implicit Method, a computational method for the simulation of incompressible free surface flows
 Messages per second, sent or received by a market data system; See Options Price Reporting Authority

Language
 Mandarin Phonetic Symbols or Bopomofo (MPS I)
 Mandarin Phonetic Symbols II

Organizations
 Banca Monte dei Paschi di Siena, the oldest extant bank, in Italy
 MPS Finance, a defunct subsidiary of Banca Monte dei Paschi di Siena
 MPS Capital Services, a subsidiary of Banca Monte dei Paschi di Siena
 Malmin Palloseura, association football club in Helsinki, Finland
 Mathematical Programming Society, mathematical society dedicated to optimization
 Max Planck Institute for Solar System Research in Germany
 Medical Protection Society, supplying legal and ethics support to health professionals
 Metropolitan Police Service of Greater London, England
 Mont Pelerin Society, international organization favoring economic liberalism
 MPS Records, Musik Produktion Schwarzwald (Music Production Black Forest), a jazz record label
 Monolithic Power Systems, an international semiconductor company

Politics
 Ministry of Social Security (Brazil), (Portuguese: Ministério da Previdência Social)
 Ministry of Public Security (disambiguation) of several countries:
 Ministry of Public Security of the People's Republic of China
 Ministerstvo Putey Soobshcheniya (Ministry of the Means of Communication) in Russian-language jurisdictions:
 Ministry of the Means of Communication (Soviet Union)
 Member of the Pharmaceutical Society of Australia
 Mouvement Patriotique de Salut, a political party in Chad

Education
 Michael Park School, Waldorf school located in Auckland, New Zealand
 Maheshwari Public School, Jaipur, India
 Marymount Primary School, Hong Kong, China
 Miami Public Schools, Miami, Oklahoma

United States
 Miss Porter's School, an all-girls preparatory school in Farmington, Connecticut
 Minneapolis Public Schools, large school district in the state of Minnesota
 Milwaukee Public Schools, largest public education district in the state of Wisconsin
 Mercyhurst Preparatory School, high school in Erie, Pennsylvania
 Midland Public Schools, school district in Midland, Michigan
 Millard Public Schools, school district in Omaha, Nebraska
 Montgomery Public Schools, a school district in Montgomery County, Alabama

Other uses 
 Members of Parliament (MPs)
 Master of Professional Studies, a terminal master's degree
 Meet-the-People Sessions, where citizens meet their members of parliament in Singapore
 Multiple Property Submission, to the US National Register of Historic Places
 Master production schedule, a plan for individual commodities to be produced
 Mazda Performance Series, Mazdaspeed European version.
 ssmypics.scr, a screensaver for Microsoft Windows
 Member of the Preferred Sex
 Marginal price auction (from Marginal Price System)
 Multiple Personality Syndrome, an obsolete term for Dissociative identity disorder

Transport
 MPS, the IATA code for Mount Pleasant Regional Airport, Texas
 MPS, the MRT station abbreviation for MacPherson MRT station, Singapore

See also
 MP (disambiguation) for topics where "MPS" is treated as the plural form